The Web 2.0 Suicide Machine is a service that helps users tired of MySpace, LinkedIn and Twitter, to "commit suicide in social networks", by automatically "removing their private content and friend relationships" (but without deleting or deactivating their accounts). The service is part of the non-profit foundation WORM, based in Rotterdam, Netherlands.

The "Web 2.0 Suicide Machine" has, as of January 2010, assisted with more than 1,000 virtual deaths, ending more than 80,500 friendships on Facebook and removing 276,000 tweets from Twitter.

How it works 
Rather than deleting user accounts, it removes private content and friendships. To start the suicide process, the user has to provide their login credential for the social network from which they want to be deleted, and then "watch your life passing by and reflect upon your real & virtual friends", while private content and friend relationships are removed. In the end the user is included in a memorial album of all the suicides, with their profile picture, their name and their "last words".

Capabilities 
"Web 2.0 Suicide Machine" has listed the functions of which the service is capable thus far as the following:

The Facebook option is no longer available on Web 2.0 Suicide Machine as Facebook sent a cease and desist (C&D) letter on January 6, 2010, demanding that suicidemachine.org stop their actions.

LinkedIn
 Logging into your account
 Changing your password and your profile picture
 Removing all your business connections
 Logging out

Myspace
 Logging into your account
 Removing all your friends
 Leaving a status message that you've committed suicide
 Logging out

Twitter
 Logging into your account
 Changing your password and your profile picture
 Removing all people you follow
 Removing all your followers
 Removing all your tweets
 Logging out

Controversy 
In January 2010, Facebook managed to block the service for a short time and sent a cease and desist letter from its lawyers. The service remained up and running, but the website has since ceased operation. Its creators "consider this project as a piece of socio-political net art".

See also

Internet relationship
Net art
Panopticon

References

External links

Web 2.0
Social networking services
Internet properties established in 2009